The 1990 Fernleaf International Classic was a women's tennis tournament played on outdoor hard courts in Wellington, New Zealand and was part of the Tier V category of the 1990 WTA Tour. It was the third edition of the tournament and was held from 5 February until 11 February 1990. Sixth-seeded Wiltrud Probst won the singles title.

Finals

Singles
 Wiltrud Probst defeated  Leila Meskhi 1–6, 6–4, 6–0
 It was Probst's first singles title of her career.

Doubles
 Natalia Medvedeva /  Leila Meskhi defeated  Michelle Jaggard-Lai /  Julie Richardson 6–3, 2–6, 6–4

See also
 1990 BP National Championships – men's tournament

References

External links
 ITF tournament edition details
 Tournament draws

Fernleaf Classic
Wellington Classic
Fern
February 1990 sports events in New Zealand